Cuba, officially the Republic of Cuba, is an island country comprising the island of Cuba, as well as Isla de la Juventud and several minor archipelagos. Cuba is located where the northern Caribbean Sea, Gulf of Mexico, and Atlantic Ocean meet. Cuba is located east of the Yucatán Peninsula (Mexico), south of both the American state of Florida and the Bahamas, west of Hispaniola (Haiti/Dominican Republic), and north of both Jamaica and the Cayman Islands. Havana is the largest city and capital; other major cities include Santiago de Cuba and Camagüey. Cuba is the second-most populous country in the Caribbean after Haiti, with over 11 million inhabitants.

The territory that is now Cuba was inhabited by the Ciboney people from the 4th millennium BC with the Guanahatabey and Taíno peoples until Spanish colonization in the 15th century. From the 15th century, it was a colony of Spain, and slavery was abolished in 1886, remaining a Spanish colony until the Spanish–American War of 1898, when Cuba was occupied by the United States and gained independence in 1902. In 1940, Cuba implemented a new constitution, but mounting political unrest culminated in a coup in 1952 and the subsequent dictatorship of Fulgencio Batista, which was later overthrown in January 1959 by the 26th of July Movement during the Cuban Revolution, which afterwards established communist rule under the leadership of Fidel Castro. The country was a point of contention during the Cold War between the Soviet Union and the United States, and a nuclear war nearly broke out during the Cuban Missile Crisis of 1962. Following the collapse of the Soviet Union, Cuba faced a severe economic downturn in the 1990s, known as the Special Period. In 2008, Fidel Castro resigned after 49 years of leadership of Cuba and was replaced by his brother Raúl Castro. 

Cuba is one of a few extant Marxist–Leninist one-party socialist states, in which the role of the vanguard Communist Party is enshrined in the Constitution. Cuba has an authoritarian regime where political opposition is not permitted.  Censorship of information (including limits to Internet access) is extensive, and independent journalism is repressed in Cuba; Reporters Without Borders has characterized Cuba as one of the worst countries in the world for press freedom.

Culturally, Cuba is considered part of Latin America. It is a multiethnic country whose people, culture and customs derive from diverse origins, including the Taíno Ciboney peoples, the long period of Spanish colonialism, the introduction of enslaved Africans and a close relationship with the Soviet Union in the Cold War.

Cuba is a founding member of the United Nations, G77, Non-Aligned Movement, Organisation of African, Caribbean and Pacific States, ALBA, and Organization of American States. It has currently one of the world's few planned economies, and its economy is dominated by the tourism industry and the exports of skilled labor, sugar, tobacco, and coffee. Cuba has historically—both before and during communist rule—performed better than other countries in the region on several socioeconomic indicators, such as literacy, infant mortality and life expectancy.

Etymology
Historians believe the name Cuba comes from the Taíno language, however "its exact derivation [is] unknown". The exact meaning of the name is unclear but it may be translated either as 'where fertile land is abundant' (cubao), or 'great place' (coabana).

Fringe theory writers who believe that Christopher Columbus was Portuguese state that Cuba was named by Columbus for the town of Cuba in the district of Beja in Portugal.

History

Pre-Columbian era

The Caribbean ground sloths, one of the last survivors of the pleistocene megafauna, lived in Cuba possibly until 2660 BCE.

Before the arrival of the Spanish, Cuba was inhabited by two distinct tribes of indigenous peoples of the Americas: the Taíno (including the Ciboney people), and the Guanahatabey.

The ancestors of the Taíno migrated from the mainland of South America, with the earliest sites dated to 5,000 BP.

The Taíno arrived from Hispaniola sometime in the 3rd century A.D. When Columbus arrived, they were the dominant culture in Cuba, having an estimated population of 150,000. It is unknown when or how the Guanahatabey arrived in Cuba, having both a different language and culture than the Taíno; it is inferred that they were a relict population of pre-Taíno settlers of the Greater Antilles.

The Taíno were farmers, as well as fishers and hunter-gatherers.

Spanish colonization and rule (1492–1898)

After first landing on an island then called Guanahani, Bahamas, on 12 October 1492, Christopher Columbus commanded his three ships: La Pinta, La Niña and the Santa María, discovering Cuba on 27 October 1492, and landing in the northeastern coast on 28 October. (This was near what is now Bariay, Holguín Province.) Columbus claimed the island for the new Kingdom of Spain and named it Isla Juana after John, Prince of Asturias.

In 1511, the first Spanish settlement was founded by Diego Velázquez de Cuéllar at Baracoa. Other settlements soon followed, including San Cristobal de la Habana, founded in 1515, which later became the capital. The indigenous Taíno were forced to work under the encomienda system, which resembled the feudal system in medieval Europe. Within a century, the indigenous people were virtually wiped out due to multiple factors, primarily Eurasian infectious diseases, to which they had no natural resistance (immunity), aggravated by the harsh conditions of the repressive colonial subjugation. In 1529, a measles outbreak in Cuba killed two-thirds of those few natives who had previously survived smallpox.

On 18 May 1539, conquistador Hernando de Soto departed from Havana with some 600 followers into a vast expedition through the American Southeast, starting in Florida, in search of gold, treasure, fame and power. On 1 September 1548, Dr. Gonzalo Perez de Angulo was appointed governor of Cuba. He arrived in Santiago, Cuba, on 4 November 1549, and immediately declared the liberty of all natives. He became Cuba's first permanent governor to reside in Havana instead of Santiago, and he built Havana's first church made of masonry.

By 1570, most residents of Cuba comprised a mixture of Spanish, African, and Taíno heritages. Cuba developed slowly and, unlike the plantation islands of the Caribbean, had a diversified agriculture. Most importantly, the colony developed as an urbanized society that primarily supported the Spanish colonial empire. By the mid-18th century, there were 50,000 slaves on the island, compared to 60,000 in Barbados and 300,000 in Virginia; as well as 450,000 in Saint-Domingue, all of which had large-scale sugarcane plantations.

The Seven Years' War, which erupted in 1754 across three continents, eventually arrived in the Spanish Caribbean. Spain's alliance with the French pitched them into direct conflict with the British, and in 1762, a British expedition consisting of dozens of ships and thousands of troops set out from Portsmouth to capture Cuba. The British arrived on 6 June, and by August, had placed Havana under siege. When Havana surrendered, the admiral of the British fleet, George Pocock and the commander of the land forces George Keppel, the 3rd Earl of Albemarle, entered the city, and took control of the western part of the island. The British immediately opened up trade with their North American and Caribbean colonies, causing a rapid transformation of Cuban society.

Though Havana, which had become the third-largest city in the Americas, was to enter an era of sustained development and increasing ties with North America during this period, the British occupation of the city proved short-lived. Pressure from London to sugar merchants, fearing a decline in sugar prices, forced negotiations with the Spanish over the captured territories. Less than a year after Britain captured Havana, it signed the 1763 Treaty of Paris together with France and Spain, ending the Seven Years' War. The treaty gave Britain Florida in exchange for Cuba. Cubans constituted one of the many diverse units which fought alongside Spanish forces during the conquest of British West Florida (1779–81).

The largest factor for the growth of Cuba's commerce in the late eighteenth and early nineteenth century was the Haitian Revolution. When the enslaved peoples of what had been the Caribbean's richest colony freed themselves through violent revolt, Cuban planters perceived the region's changing circumstances with both a sense of fear and opportunity. They were afraid because of the prospect that slaves might revolt in Cuba as well, and numerous prohibitions during the 1790s of the sale of slaves in Cuba who had previously been enslaved in French colonies underscored this anxiety. The planters saw opportunity, however, because they thought that they could exploit the situation by transforming Cuba into the slave society and sugar-producing "pearl of the Antilles" that Haiti had been before the revolution. As the historian Ada Ferrer has written, "At a basic level, liberation in Saint-Domingue helped entrench its denial in Cuba. As slavery and colonialism collapsed in the French colony, the Spanish island underwent transformations that were almost the mirror image of Haiti's." Estimates suggest that between 1790 and 1820 some 325,000 Africans were imported to Cuba as slaves, which was four times the amount that had arrived between 1760 and 1790.

Although a smaller proportion of the population of Cuba was enslaved, at times, slaves arose in revolt. In 1812, the Aponte Slave Rebellion took place, but it was ultimately suppressed. The population of Cuba in 1817 was 630,980 (of which 291,021 were white, 115,691 were free people of color (mixed-race), and 224,268 black slaves).

In part due to Cuban slaves working primarily in urbanized settings, by the 19th century, the practice of  had developed (or "buying oneself out of slavery", a "uniquely Cuban development"), according to historian Herbert S. Klein. Due to a shortage of white labor, blacks dominated urban industries "to such an extent that when whites in large numbers came to Cuba in the middle of the nineteenth century, they were unable to displace Negro workers." A system of diversified agriculture, with small farms and fewer slaves, served to supply the cities with produce and other goods.

In the 1820s, when the rest of Spain's empire in Latin America rebelled and formed independent states, Cuba remained loyal to Spain. Its economy was based on serving the empire. By 1860, Cuba had 213,167 free people of color (39% of its non-white population of 550,000).

Independence movements

Full independence from Spain was the goal of a rebellion in 1868 led by planter Carlos Manuel de Céspedes. De Céspedes, a sugar planter, freed his slaves to fight with him for an independent Cuba. On 27 December 1868, he issued a decree condemning slavery in theory but accepting it in practice and declaring free any slaves whose masters present them for military service. The 1868 rebellion resulted in a prolonged conflict known as the Ten Years' War. A great number of the rebels were volunteers from the Dominican Republic, and other countries, as well as numerous Chinese indentured servants.

The United States declined to recognize the new Cuban government, although many European and Latin American nations did so. In 1878, the Pact of Zanjón ended the conflict, with Spain promising greater autonomy to Cuba. In 1879–80, Cuban patriot Calixto García attempted to start another war known as the Little War but failed to receive enough support. Slavery in Cuba was abolished in 1875 but the process was completed only in 1886. An exiled dissident named José Martí founded the Cuban Revolutionary Party in New York in 1892. The aim of the party was to achieve Cuban independence from Spain. In January 1895, Martí traveled to Monte Cristi and Santo Domingo in the Dominican Republic to join the efforts of Máximo Gómez. Martí recorded his political views in the Manifesto of Montecristi. Fighting against the Spanish army began in Cuba on 24 February 1895, but Martí was unable to reach Cuba until 11 April 1895. Martí was killed in the Battle of Dos Rios on 19 May 1895. His death immortalized him as Cuba's national hero.

Around 200,000 Spanish troops outnumbered the much smaller rebel army, which relied mostly on guerrilla and sabotage tactics. The Spaniards began a campaign of suppression. General Valeriano Weyler, the military governor of Cuba, herded the rural population into what he called , described by international observers as "fortified towns". These are often considered the prototype for 20th-century concentration camps. Between 200,000 and 400,000 Cuban civilians died from starvation and disease in the Spanish concentration camps, numbers verified by the Red Cross and United States Senator Redfield Proctor, a former Secretary of War. American and European protests against Spanish conduct on the island followed.

The U.S. battleship USS Maine was sent to protect American interests, but soon after arrival, it exploded in Havana harbor and sank quickly, killing nearly three-quarters of the crew. The cause and responsibility for the sinking of the ship remained unclear after a board of inquiry. Popular opinion in the U.S., fueled by an active press, concluded that the Spanish were to blame and demanded action. Spain and the United States declared war on each other in late April 1898.

Republic (1902–1959)

First years (1902–1925)

Cuba gained formal independence from the U.S. on 20 May 1902, as the Republic of Cuba. Under Cuba's new constitution, the U.S. retained the right to intervene in Cuban affairs and to supervise its finances and foreign relations. Under the Platt Amendment, the U.S. leased the Guantánamo Bay Naval Base from Cuba.

Following disputed elections in 1906, the first president, Tomás Estrada Palma, faced an armed revolt by independence war veterans who defeated the meager government forces. The U.S. intervened by occupying Cuba and named Charles Edward Magoon as Governor for three years. Cuban historians have characterized Magoon's governorship as having introduced political and social corruption. In 1908, self-government was restored when José Miguel Gómez was elected president, but the U.S. continued intervening in Cuban affairs. In 1912, the Partido Independiente de Color attempted to establish a separate black republic in Oriente Province, but was suppressed by General Monteagudo with considerable bloodshed.

In 1924, Gerardo Machado was elected president. During his administration, tourism increased markedly, and American-owned hotels and restaurants were built to accommodate the influx of tourists. The tourist boom led to increases in gambling and prostitution in Cuba. The Wall Street Crash of 1929 led to a collapse in the price of sugar, political unrest, and repression. Protesting students, known as the Generation of 1930, turned to violence in opposition to the increasingly unpopular Machado. A general strike (in which the Communist Party sided with Machado), uprisings among sugar workers, and an army revolt forced Machado into exile in August 1933. He was replaced by Carlos Manuel de Céspedes y Quesada.

Revolution of 1933–1940
In September 1933, the Sergeants' Revolt, led by Sergeant Fulgencio Batista, overthrew Céspedes. A five-member executive committee (the Pentarchy of 1933) was chosen to head a provisional government. Ramón Grau San Martín was then appointed as provisional president. Grau resigned in 1934, leaving the way clear for Batista, who dominated Cuban politics for the next 25 years, at first through a series of puppet-presidents. The period from 1933 to 1937 was a time of "virtually unremitting social and political warfare". On balance, during the period 1933–1940 Cuba suffered from fragile politic structures, reflected in the fact that it saw three different presidents in two years (1935–1936), and in the militaristic and repressive policies of Batista as Head of the Army.

Constitution of 1940 
A new constitution was adopted in 1940, which engineered radical progressive ideas, including the right to labor and health care. Batista was elected president in the same year, holding the post until 1944. He is so far the only non-white Cuban to win the nation's highest political office. His government carried out major social reforms. Several members of the Communist Party held office under his administration. Cuban armed forces were not greatly involved in combat during World War II—though president Batista did suggest a joint U.S.-Latin American assault on Francoist Spain to overthrow its authoritarian regime.

Batista adhered to the 1940 constitution's strictures preventing his re-election. Ramon Grau San Martin was the winner of the next election, in 1944. Grau further corroded the base of the already teetering legitimacy of the Cuban political system, in particular by undermining the deeply flawed, though not entirely ineffectual, Congress and Supreme Court. Carlos Prío Socarrás, a protégé of Grau, became president in 1948. The two terms of the Auténtico Party brought an influx of investment, which fueled an economic boom, raised living standards for all segments of society, and created a middle class in most urban areas.

Coup d'état of 1952 

After finishing his term in 1944 Batista lived in Florida, returning to Cuba to run for president in 1952. Facing certain electoral defeat, he led a military coup that preempted the election. Back in power, and receiving financial, military, and logistical support from the United States government, Batista suspended the 1940 Constitution and revoked most political liberties, including the right to strike. He then aligned with the wealthiest landowners who owned the largest sugar plantations, and presided over a stagnating economy that widened the gap between rich and poor Cubans. Batista outlawed the Cuban Communist Party in 1952. After the coup, Cuba had Latin America's highest per capita consumption rates of meat, vegetables, cereals, automobiles, telephones and radios, though about one-third of the population was considered poor and enjoyed relatively little of this consumption. However, in his "History Will Absolve Me" speech, Fidel Castro mentioned that national issues relating to land, industrialization, housing, unemployment, education, and health were contemporary problems.

In 1958, Cuba was a well-advanced country in comparison to other Latin American regions. Cuba was also affected by perhaps the largest labor union privileges in Latin America, including bans on dismissals and mechanization. They were obtained in large measure "at the cost of the unemployed and the peasants", leading to disparities. Between 1933 and 1958, Cuba extended economic regulations enormously, causing economic problems. Unemployment became a problem as graduates entering the workforce could not find jobs. The middle class, which was comparable to that of the United States, became increasingly dissatisfied with unemployment and political persecution. The labor unions, manipulated by the previous government since 1948 through union "yellowness", supported Batista until the very end. Batista stayed in power until he resigned in December 1958 under the pressure of the US Embassy and as the revolutionary forces headed by Fidel Castro were winning militarily (Santa Clara city, a strategic point in the middle of the country, fell into the rebels hands on December 31, in a conflict known as the Battle of Santa Clara).

Revolution and Communist Party rule (1959–present)

In the 1950s, various organizations, including some advocating armed uprising, competed for public support in bringing about political change. In 1956, Fidel Castro and about 80 supporters landed from the yacht Granma in an attempt to start a rebellion against the Batista government. In 1958, Castro's July 26th Movement emerged as the leading revolutionary group. The U.S. supported Castro by imposing a 1958 arms embargo against Batista's government. Batista evaded the American embargo and acquired weapons from the Dominican Republic, including Dominican-made Cristóbal Carbines, hand grenades, and mortars.

By late 1958, the rebels had broken out of the Sierra Maestra and launched a general popular insurrection. After Castro's fighters captured Santa Clara, Batista fled with his family to the Dominican Republic on 1 January 1959. Later he went into exile on the Portuguese island of Madeira and finally settled in Estoril, near Lisbon. Fidel Castro's forces entered the capital on 8 January 1959. The liberal Manuel Urrutia Lleó became the provisional president.

According to Amnesty International, official death sentences from 1959 to 1987 numbered 237 of which all but 21 were actually carried out. Other estimates for the total number of political executions go up to as many as 4,000. The vast majority of those executed directly following the 1959 Revolution were policemen, politicians, and informers of the Batista regime accused of crimes such as torture and murder, and their public trials and executions had widespread popular support among the Cuban population.

The United States government initially reacted favorably to the Cuban Revolution, seeing it as part of a movement to bring democracy to Latin America. Castro's legalization of the Communist Party and the hundreds of executions of Batista agents, policemen, and soldiers that followed caused a deterioration in the relationship between the two countries. The promulgation of the Agrarian Reform Law, expropriating thousands of acres of farmland (including from large U.S. landholders), further worsened relations. In response, between 1960 and 1964 the U.S. imposed a range of sanctions, eventually including a total ban on trade between the countries and a freeze on all Cuban-owned assets in the U.S. In February 1960, Castro signed a commercial agreement with Soviet Vice-Premier Anastas Mikoyan.

In March 1960, U.S. President Dwight D. Eisenhower gave his approval to a CIA plan to arm and train a group of Cuban refugees to overthrow the Castro government. The invasion (known as the Bay of Pigs Invasion) took place on 14 April 1961, during the term of President John F. Kennedy. About 1,400 Cuban exiles disembarked at the Bay of Pigs. Cuban troops and local militias defeated the invasion, killing over 100 invaders and taking the remainder prisoner. In January 1962, Cuba was suspended from the Organization of American States (OAS), and later the same year the OAS started to impose sanctions against Cuba of similar nature to the U.S. sanctions. The Cuban Missile Crisis of October 1962 almost sparked World War III. By 1963, Cuba was moving towards a full-fledged communist system modeled on the USSR.

In 1963, Cuba sent 686 troops together with 22 tanks and other military equipment to support Algeria in the Sand War against Morocco. In 1964, Cuba organized a meeting of Latin American communists in Havana and stoked a civil war in the capital of the Dominican Republic in 1965, which prompted the U.S. military to intervene there. Che Guevara engaged in guerrilla activities in Africa and was killed in 1967 while attempting to start a revolution in Bolivia. During the 1970s, Fidel Castro dispatched tens of thousands of troops in support of Soviet-supported wars in Africa. He supported the MPLA in Angola (Angolan Civil War) and Mengistu Haile Mariam in Ethiopia (Ogaden War).

In November 1975, Cuba poured more than 65,000 troops and 400 Soviet-made tanks into Angola in one of the fastest military mobilizations in history. South Africa developed nuclear weapons due to the threat to its security posed by the presence of large numbers of Cuban troops in Angola. In 1976 and again in 1988 at the Battle of Cuito Cuanavale, the Cubans alongside their MPLA allies defeated UNITA rebels and apartheid South African forces. In March 1978, Cuba sent 12,000 regular troops to Ethiopia, assisted by mechanized Soviet battalions, to help defeat a Somali invasion. Ethiopians backed by Cubans and Soviets pushed the Somalis back to their original borders.

Despite Cuba's small size and the long distance separating it from the Middle East, Castro's Cuba played an active role in the region during the Cold War. In 1972, a major Cuban military mission consisting of tank, air, and artillery specialists was dispatched to South Yemen. The Cubans were also involved in the Syrian-Israeli War of Attrition (November 1973–May 1974) that followed the Yom Kippur War (October 1973). Israeli sources reported the presence of a Cuban tank brigade in the Golan Heights, which was supported by two brigades. The Israelis and the Cuban-Syrian tank forces engaged in battle on the Golan front.

The standard of living in the 1970s was "extremely spartan" and discontent was rife. Fidel Castro admitted the failures of economic policies in a 1970 speech. In 1975, the OAS lifted its sanctions against Cuba, with the approval of 16 member states, including the U.S. The U.S., however, maintained its own sanctions. In 1979, the U.S. objected to the presence of Soviet combat troops on the island. U.S. forces invaded the Caribbean island of Grenada in 1983, overthrowing the Cuban backed Hudson Austin and killing  24 Cuban soldiers and expelling the remainder of the Cuban forces from the island. During the 1970s and 1980s, Castro supported Marxist insurgencies in Guatemala, El Salvador, and Nicaragua. Cuba gradually withdrew its troops from Angola in 1989–91.

Soviet troops began to withdraw from Cuba in September 1991, and Castro's rule was severely tested in the aftermath of the Soviet collapse in December 1991 (known in Cuba as the Special Period). The country faced a severe economic downturn following the withdrawal of Soviet subsidies worth  to  annually, resulting in effects such as food and fuel shortages. The government did not accept American donations of food, medicines, and cash until 1993. On 5 August 1994, state security dispersed protesters in a spontaneous protest in Havana. From the start of the crisis to 1995, Cuba saw its gross domestic product (GDP) shrink 35%. It took another five years for its GDP to reach pre-crisis levels.

Cuba has since found a new source of aid and support in the People's Republic of China. In addition, Hugo Chávez, then-President of Venezuela, and Evo Morales, former President of Bolivia, became allies and both countries are major oil and gas exporters. In 2003, the government arrested and imprisoned a large number of civil activists, a period known as the "Black Spring".

In February 2008, Fidel Castro announced his resignation as President of the State Council following the onset of his reported serious gastrointestinal illness in July 2006. On 24 February his brother, Raúl Castro, was declared the new president. In his inauguration speech, Raúl promised that some of the restrictions on freedom in Cuba would be removed. In March 2009, Raúl Castro removed some of his brother's appointees.

On 3 June 2009, the Organization of American States adopted a resolution to end the 47-year ban on Cuban membership of the group. The resolution stated, however, that full membership would be delayed until Cuba was "in conformity with the practices, purposes, and principles of the OAS". Fidel Castro restated his position that he was not interested in joining after the OAS resolution had been announced.

Effective 14 January 2013, Cuba ended the requirement established in 1961, that any citizens who wish to travel abroad were required to obtain an expensive government permit and a letter of invitation. In 1961 the Cuban government had imposed broad restrictions on travel to prevent the mass emigration of people after the 1959 revolution; it approved exit visas only on rare occasions. Requirements were simplified: Cubans need only a passport and a national ID card to leave; and they are allowed to take their young children with them for the first time. However, a passport costs on average five months' salary. Observers expect that Cubans with paying relatives abroad are most likely to be able to take advantage of the new policy. In the first year of the program, over 180,000 left Cuba and returned.

, talks with Cuban officials and American officials, including President Barack Obama, resulted in the release of Alan Gross, fifty-two political prisoners, and an unnamed non-citizen agent of the United States in return for the release of three Cuban agents currently imprisoned in the United States. Additionally, while the embargo between the United States and Cuba was not immediately lifted, it was relaxed to allow import, export, and certain limited commerce.

Cuba approved a new constitution in 2019. The optional vote attracted 84.4% of eligible voters. 90% of those who voted approved of the new constitution and 9% opposed it. The new constitution states that the Communist Party is the only legitimate political party, describes access to health and education as fundamental rights, imposes presidential term limits, enshrines the right to legal representation upon arrest, recognizes private property, and strengthens the rights of multinationals investing with the state.

In July 2021 there were several large protests against the government under the banner of Patria y Vida. Protests included support from both right-leaning and left-leaning anti-regime Cuban exiles. The song associated with the movement received international acclaim including a Latin Grammy Award.

On 25 September 2022, Cuba approved a referendum which amended the Family Code as well as legalising same-sex marriage and same-sex adoption, making Cuba the first Marxist-Leninist country to do so.

Government and politics

The Republic of Cuba is one of the few socialist countries following the Marxist–Leninist ideology. The Constitution of 1976, which defined Cuba as a socialist republic, was replaced by the Constitution of 1992, which is "guided by the ideas of José Martí and the political and social ideas of Marx, Engels and Lenin." The constitution describes the Communist Party of Cuba as the "leading force of society and of the state".

The First Secretary of the Communist Party of Cuba is the most senior position in the one-party state. The First Secretary leads the Politburo and the Secretariat, making the office holder the most powerful person in Cuban government. Members of both councils are elected by the National Assembly of People's Power. The President of Cuba, who is also elected by the Assembly, serves for five years and since the ratification of the 2019 Constitution, there is a limit of two consecutive five-year terms.

The People's Supreme Court serves as Cuba's highest judicial branch of government. It is also the court of last resort for all appeals against the decisions of provincial courts.

Cuba's national legislature, the National Assembly of People's Power (Asamblea Nacional de Poder Popular), is the supreme organ of power; 609 members serve five-year terms. The assembly meets twice a year; between sessions legislative power is held by the 31 member Council of Ministers. Candidates for the Assembly are approved by public referendum. All Cuban citizens over 16 who have not been convicted of a criminal offense can vote. Article 131 of the Constitution states that voting shall be "through free, equal and secret vote". Article 136 states: "In order for deputies or delegates to be considered elected they must get more than half the number of valid votes cast in the electoral districts".

There are elections in Cuba, but they are not considered democratic. In elections for the National Assembly of People's Power there is only one candidate for each seat, and candidates are nominated by committees that are firmly controlled by the Communist Party. Most legislative districts elect multiple representatives to the Assembly. Voters can select individual candidates on their ballot, select every candidate, or leave every question blank, with no option to vote against candidates.

No political party is permitted to nominate candidates or campaign on the island, including the Communist Party. The Communist Party of Cuba has held six party congress meetings since 1975. In 2011, the party stated that there were 800,000 members, and representatives generally constitute at least half of the Councils of state and the National Assembly. The remaining positions are filled by candidates nominally without party affiliation. Other political parties campaign and raise finances internationally, while activity within Cuba by opposition groups is minimal.

Cuba is considered an authoritarian regime according to The Economist's Democracy Index and Freedom in the World reports.  More specifically, Cuba is considered a military dictatorship in the Democracy-Dictatorship Index, and has been described as "a militarized society" with the armed forces having long been the most powerful institution in the country.

In February 2013, President of the State Council Raúl Castro announced he would resign in 2018, ending his five-year term, and that he hopes to implement permanent term limits for future Cuban presidents, including age limits.

After Fidel Castro died on 25 November 2016, the Cuban government declared a nine-day mourning period. During the mourning period Cuban citizens were prohibited from playing loud music, partying, and drinking alcohol.

Miguel Díaz-Canel was elected president on 18 April 2018 after the resignation of Raúl Castro. On 19 April 2021, Miguel Díaz-Canel became First Secretary of the Communist Party. He is the first non-Castro to be in such top position since the Cuban revolution of 1959.

Foreign relations

Cuba has conducted a foreign policy that is uncharacteristic of such a minor, developing country. Under Castro, Cuba was heavily involved in wars in Africa, Central America and Asia. Cuba supported Algeria in 1961–1965, and sent tens of thousands of troops to Angola during the Angolan Civil War. Other countries that featured Cuban involvement include Ethiopia, Guinea, Guinea-Bissau, Mozambique, and Yemen. Lesser known actions include the 1959 missions to the Dominican Republic. The expedition failed, but a prominent monument to its members was erected in their memory in Santo Domingo by the Dominican government, and they feature prominently at the country's Memorial Museum of the Resistance.

In 2008, the European Union (EU) and Cuba agreed to resume full relations and cooperation activities. Cuba is a founding member of the Bolivarian Alliance for the Americas. At the end of 2012, tens of thousands of Cuban medical personnel worked abroad, with as many as 30,000 doctors in Venezuela alone via the two countries' oil-for-doctors programme.

In 1996, the United States, then under President Bill Clinton, brought in the Cuban Liberty and Democratic Solidarity Act, better known as the Helms–Burton Act. In 2009, United States President Barack Obama stated on 17 April, in Trinidad and Tobago that "the United States seeks a new beginning with Cuba", and reversed the Bush Administration's prohibition on travel and remittances by Cuban-Americans from the United States to Cuba. Five years later, an agreement between the United States and Cuba, popularly called the "Cuban thaw", brokered in part by Canada and Pope Francis, began the process of restoring international relations between the two countries. They agreed to release political prisoners and the United States began the process of creating an embassy in Havana. This was realized on 30 June 2015, when Cuba and the U.S. reached a deal to reopen embassies in their respective capitals on 20 July 2015 and reestablish diplomatic relations. Earlier in the same year, the White House announced that President Obama would remove Cuba from the American government's list of nations that sponsor terrorism, which Cuba reportedly welcomed as "fair". On 17 September 2017, the United States considered closing its Cuban embassy following mysterious medical symptoms experienced by its staff.

Military

In 1985, Cuba devoted more than 10% of its GDP to military expenditures. During the Cold War, Cuba built up one of the largest armed forces in Latin America, second only to that of Brazil.

From 1975 until the late 1980s, Soviet military assistance enabled Cuba to upgrade its military capabilities. After the loss of Soviet subsidies, Cuba scaled down the numbers of military personnel, from 235,000 in 1994 to about 49,000 in 2021.

In 2017, Cuba signed the UN treaty on the Prohibition of Nuclear Weapons.

Law enforcement

All law enforcement agencies are maintained under Cuba's Ministry of the Interior, which is supervised by the Revolutionary Armed Forces. In Cuba, citizens can receive police assistance by dialing "106" on their telephones. The police force, which is referred to as "Policía Nacional Revolucionaria" or PNR is then expected to provide help. The Cuban government also has an agency called the Intelligence Directorate that conducts intelligence operations and maintains close ties with the Russian Federal Security Service.

Administrative divisions

The country is subdivided into 15 provinces and one special municipality (Isla de la Juventud). These were formerly part of six larger historical provinces: Pinar del Río, Habana, Matanzas, Las Villas, Camagüey and Oriente. The present subdivisions closely resemble those of the Spanish military provinces during the Cuban Wars of Independence, when the most troublesome areas were subdivided. The provinces are divided into municipalities.

Human rights

The Cuban government has been accused of numerous human rights abuses including torture, arbitrary imprisonment, unfair trials, and extrajudicial executions (also known as "El Paredón"). Human Rights Watch has stated that the government "represses nearly all forms of political dissent" and that "Cubans are systematically denied basic rights to free expression, association, assembly, privacy, movement, and due process of law".

In 2003, the European Union (EU) accused the Cuban government of "continuing flagrant violation of human rights and fundamental freedoms". It has continued to call regularly for social and economic reform in Cuba, along with the unconditional release of all political prisoners.

Since 1960, the United States has placed a continued embargo against Cuba. The Cuban Democracy Act of 1992 states that sanctions will continue "so long as it continues to refuse to move toward democratization and greater respect for human rights". American diplomat Lester D. Mallory wrote an internal memo on April 6, 1960, arguing in favor of an embargo: "The only foreseeable means of alienating internal support is through disenchantment and disaffection based on economic dissatisfaction and hardship. [...] to decrease monetary and real wages, to bring about hunger, desperation and overthrow of government." The UN General Assembly has passed a resolution every year since 1992 condemning the embargo and stating that it violates the Charter of the United Nations and international law. Cuba considers the embargo a human rights violation.

On 17 December 2014, United States President Barack Obama announced the re-establishment of diplomatic relations with Cuba, pushing for Congress to put an end to the embargo, as well as the United States-run Guantanamo Bay detention camp. These diplomatic improvements were later deteriorated by the Trump Administration, who enacted new rules and re-enforced the business and travel restrictions which were loosened by the Obama Administration. These sanctions were inherited and strengthened by the Biden Administration.

Cuba was ranked 19th by the number of imprisoned journalists of any nation in 2021 according to various sources, including the Committee to Protect Journalists and Human Rights Watch.

Cuban dissidents face arrest and imprisonment. In the 1990s, Human Rights Watch reported that Cuba's extensive prison system, one of the largest in Latin America, consists of 40 maximum-security prisons, 30 minimum-security prisons, and over 200 work camps. According to Human Rights Watch, Cuba's prison population is confined in "substandard and unhealthy conditions, where prisoners face physical and sexual abuse".

In July 2010, the unofficial Cuban Human Rights Commission said there were 167 political prisoners in Cuba, a fall from 201 at the start of the year. The head of the commission stated that long prison sentences were being replaced by harassment and intimidation. During the entire period of Castro's rule over the island, an estimated 200,000 people had been imprisoned or deprived of their freedoms for political reasons.

Cuba ranks 171st out of 180th on the 2020 World Press Freedom Index.

Economy

The Cuban state asserts its adherence to socialist principles in organizing its largely state-controlled planned economy. Most of the means of production are owned and run by the government and most of the labor force is employed by the state. Recent years have seen a trend toward more private sector employment. By 2006, public sector employment was 78% and private sector 22%, compared to 91.8% to 8.2% in 1981. Government spending is 78.1% of GDP. Since the early 2010s, following the initial market reforms, it has become popular to describe the economy as being, or moving toward, market socialism. Any firm that hires a Cuban must pay the Cuban government, which in turn pays the employee in Cuban pesos. The average monthly wage  was 466 Cuban pesos—about US$19. However, after an economic reform in January 2021, the minimum wage is about 2100 CUP (US$17.50) and the median wage is about 4000 CUP (US$33).

Cuba had Cuban pesos (CUP) set at par with the US dollar before 1959. Every Cuban household has a ration book (known as libreta) entitling it to a monthly supply of food and other staples, which are provided at nominal cost.

According to the Havana Consulting Group, in 2014, remittances to Cuba amounted to US$3,129 million, the seventh highest in Latin America. In 2019, remittances had grown to US$6,616 million, but dropped down to US$1,967 million in 2020, due to the COVID-19 pandemic. The pandemic has also devastated Cuba's tourist industry, which along with a tightening of U.S. sanctions, has led to large increase in emigration among younger working-age Cubans. It has been described as a crisis that is "threatening the stability" of Cuba,  which "already has one of the hemisphere’s oldest populations".

History
Before the 1959 revolution, Cuba was one of the richest countries in Latin America. The country's economy in the middle part of the 20th century, fuelled by the sale of sugar to the United States, had grown wealthy. Cuba ranked 5th in the hemisphere in per capita income, 3rd in life expectancy, 2nd in per capita ownership of automobiles and telephones, and 1st in the number of television sets per inhabitant. Cuba's literacy rate, 76%, was the fourth highest in Latin America although two-thirds of the people received three years of education or less; one-third never attended school and half the adult population could neither read nor write. Cuba also ranked 11th in the world in the number of doctors per capita, although there was massive inequality in the distribution of doctors; for example more than 60% of all doctors lived and worked in Havana in 1958 and even when they worked outside Havana province they typically worked in other provincial capitals.

US companies dominated the Cuban economy before the Revolution, controlling 80% of Cuba's trade. US firms ran public utilities, the railroad, and all of the oil refineries. Two-thirds of food production came from US-owned agro-business enterprises. US developers owned half of the arable land on the island. Just 8% of landholders owned three-quarters of the land. At least 25% of the population was unemployed. 20% of the population received 58% of the income, while the bottom 20% took in just 2%.

According to PBS, a thriving middle class held the promise of prosperity and social mobility. According to Cuba historian Louis Perez of the University of North Carolina at Chapel Hill, "Havana was then what Las Vegas has become."

After the Cuban Revolution and before the collapse of the Soviet Union, Cuba depended on Moscow for substantial aid and sheltered markets for its exports, valued at $65 billion in subsidies in total from 1960 to 1990. This accounted for between 10% and 40% of Cuban GDP, depending on the year. The loss of these subsidies sent the Cuban economy into a rapid depression known in Cuba as the Special Period, which saw the country's GDP decline by 33% between 1990 and 1993. Cuba took limited free-market oriented measures to alleviate severe shortages of food, consumer goods, and services. These steps included allowing some self-employment in certain retail and light manufacturing sectors, the legalization of the use of the US dollar in business, and the encouragement of tourism. Cuba has developed a unique urban farm system called  to compensate for the end of food imports from the Soviet Union. The U.S. embargo against Cuba was instituted in 1960 in response to nationalization of U.S.-citizen-held property and was maintained on the grounds of perceived human rights violations. It is widely viewed that the embargo hurt the Cuban economy. In 2009, the Cuban Government estimated this loss at $685 million annually.

Its major export partners are Canada 17.7%, China 16.9%, Venezuela 12.5%, Netherlands 9%, and Spain 5.9% (2012). Cuba's major exports are sugar, nickel, tobacco, fish, medical products, citrus fruits, and coffee; imports include food, fuel, clothing, and machinery. According to the Heritage Foundation, Cuba is dependent on credit accounts that rotate from country to country. Cuba's prior 35% supply of the world's export market for sugar has declined to 10% due to a variety of factors, including a global sugar commodity price drop that made Cuba less competitive on world markets. It was announced in 2008 that wage caps would be abandoned to improve the nation's productivity.

Cuba's leadership has called for reforms in the country's agricultural system. In 2008, Raúl Castro began enacting agrarian reforms to boost food production, as at that time 80% of food was imported. The reforms aim to expand land use and increase efficiency. Venezuela supplies Cuba with an estimated  of oil per day in exchange for money and the services of some 44,000 Cubans, most of them medical personnel, in Venezuela.
 

, Cubans were allowed to build their own houses. According to Raúl Castro, they could now improve their houses, but the government would not endorse these new houses or improvements. There is virtually no homelessness in Cuba, and 85% of Cubans own their homes and pay no property taxes or mortgage interest. Mortgage payments may not exceed 10% of a household's combined income..

On 2 August 2011, The New York Times reported that Cuba reaffirmed its intent to legalize "buying and selling" of private property before the year's end. According to experts, the private sale of property could "transform Cuba more than any of the economic reforms announced by President Raúl Castro's government". It would cut more than one million state jobs, including party bureaucrats who resist the changes. The reforms created what some call "New Cuban Economy". In October 2013, Raúl said he intended to merge the two currencies, but , the dual currency system remains in force.

In August 2012, a specialist of the "Cubaenergia Company" announced the opening of Cuba's first Solar Power Plant. As a member of the Cubasolar Group, there was also a mention of ten additional plants in 2013.

In 2016, the Miami Herald wrote, "... about 27 percent of Cubans earn under $50 per month; 34 percent earn the equivalent of $50 to $100 per month; and 20 percent earn $101 to $200. Twelve percent reported earning $201 to $500 a month; and almost 4 percent said their monthly earnings topped $500, including 1.5 percent who said they earned more than $1,000."

In May 2019, Cuba imposed rationing of staples such as chicken, eggs, rice, beans, soap and other basic goods. (Some two-thirds of food in the country is imported.) A spokesperson blamed the increased U.S. trade embargo although economists believe that an equally important problem is the massive decline of aid from Venezuela and the failure of Cuba's state-run oil company which had subsidized fuel costs.

In June 2019, the government announced an increase in public sector wages of about 300%, specifically for teachers and health personnel. In October, the government allowed stores to purchase house equipment and similar items, using international currency, and send it to Cuba by the Cuban emigration. The leaders of the government recognized that the new measures were unpopular but necessary to contain the capital flight to other countries as Panamá where Cuban citizens traveled and imported items to resell on the island. Other measures included allowing private companies to export and import, through state companies, resources to produce products and services in Cuba.

On January 1, 2021, Cuba's dual currency system was formally ended, and the convertible Cuban peso (CUC) was phased out, leaving the Cuban peso (CUP) as the country's sole currency unit. Cuban citizens had until June 2021 to exchange their CUCs. However, this devalued the Cuban peso and caused economic problems for people who had been previously paid in CUCs, particularly workers in the tourism industry. Also, in February, the government dictated new measures to the private sector, with prohibitions for only 124 activities, in areas like national security, health and educational services. The wages were increased again, between 4 and 9 times, for all the sectors. Also, new facilities were allowed to the state companies, with much more autonomy.

The first problems of the new reform, for the public opinion, were with the electricity prices, but that was amended quickly. Other measures corrected were in the prices to the private farmers. In July 2020, Cuba opened new stores accepting only foreign currency while simultaneously eliminating a special tax on the U.S. dollar to combat an economic crisis arising initially due to economic sanctions imposed by the Trump administration, then later worsened by a lack of tourism during the coronavirus pandemic. These economic sanctions have since been sustained by the Biden administration.

Resources
Cuba's natural resources include sugar, tobacco, fish, citrus fruits, coffee, beans, rice, potatoes, and livestock. Cuba's most important mineral resource is nickel, with 21% of total exports in 2011. The output of Cuba's nickel mines that year was 71,000 tons, approaching 4% of world production.  its reserves were estimated at 5.5 million tons, over 7% of the world total. Sherritt International of Canada operates a large nickel mining facility in Moa. Cuba is also a major producer of refined cobalt, a by-product of nickel mining.

In 2006, Cuba started to test-drill these locations for possible exploitation.

Tourism

Tourism was initially restricted to enclave resorts where tourists would be segregated from Cuban society, referred to as "enclave tourism" and "tourism apartheid". Contact between foreign visitors and ordinary Cubans were  illegal between 1992 and 1997. The rapid growth of tourism during the Special Period had widespread social and economic repercussions in Cuba, and led to speculation about the emergence of a two-tier economy.

Cuba recorded 2,688,000 international tourists in 2011, the third-highest figure in the Caribbean (behind the Dominican Republic and Puerto Rico).

The medical tourism sector caters to thousands of European, Latin American, Canadian, and American consumers every year.

A recent study indicates that Cuba has a potential for mountaineering activity, and that mountaineering could be a key contributor to tourism, along with other activities, e.g. biking, diving, caving. Promoting these resources could contribute to regional development, prosperity, and well-being.

The Cuban Justice minister downplays allegations of widespread sex tourism. According to a Government of Canada travel advice website, "Cuba is actively working to prevent child sex tourism, and a number of tourists, including Canadians, have been convicted of offences related to the corruption of minors aged 16 and under. Prison sentences range from 7 to 25 years."

Some tourist facilities were extensively damaged on 8 September 2017 when Hurricane Irma hit the island. The storm made landfall in the Camagüey Archipelago; the worst damage was in the keys north of the main island, however, and not in the most significant tourist areas.

Transport

Geography

Cuba is an archipelago of nearly 4,200 islands, cays and islets located in the northern Caribbean Sea at the confluence with the Gulf of Mexico and the Atlantic Ocean. It lies between latitudes 19° and 24°N, and longitudes 74° and 85°W. The United States (Key West, Florida) lies 150 km (93 miles) across the Straits of Florida to the north and northwest, and The Bahamas (Cay Lobos) 22 km (13.6 mi) to the north. Mexico lies 210 km (130.5 mi) west across the Yucatán Channel (to the closest tip of Cabo Catoche in the State of Quintana Roo).

Haiti is 77 km (47.8 mi) east and Jamaica 140 km (87 mi) south. Cuba is the principal island, surrounded by four smaller groups of islands: the Colorados Archipelago on the northwestern coast, the Sabana-Camagüey Archipelago on the north-central Atlantic coast, the Jardines de la Reina on the south-central coast and the Canarreos Archipelago on the southwestern coast.

The main island consists mostly of flat to rolling plains apart from the Sierra Maestra mountains in the southeast, whose highest point is Pico Turquino.

Its area is  including coastal and territorial waters.

Climate

With the entire island south of the Tropic of Cancer, the local climate is tropical, moderated by northeasterly trade winds that blow year-round. The temperature is also shaped by the Caribbean current, which brings in warm water from the equator. This makes the climate of Cuba warmer than that of Hong Kong, which is at around the same latitude as Cuba but has a subtropical rather than a tropical climate. In general (with local variations), there is a drier season from November to April, and a rainier season from May to October. The warm temperatures of the Caribbean Sea and the fact that Cuba sits across the entrance to the Gulf of Mexico combine to make the country prone to frequent hurricanes. These are most common in September and October.

The worst damage was in the keys north of the main island. Hospitals, warehouses and factories were damaged; much of the north coast was without electricity. By that time, nearly a million people, including tourists, had been evacuated. The Varadero resort area also reported widespread damage; the government believed that repairs could be completed before the start of the main tourist season. Subsequent reports indicated that ten people had been killed during the storm, including seven in Havana, most during building collapses. Sections of the capital had been flooded.

Biodiversity 

Cuba signed the Rio Convention on Biological Diversity on 12 June 1992, and became a party to the convention on 8 March 1994. It has subsequently produced a National Biodiversity Strategy and Action Plan, with one revision, that the convention received on 24 January 2008.

The country's fourth national report to the CBD contains a detailed breakdown of the numbers of species of each kingdom of life recorded from Cuba, the main groups being: animals (17,801 species), bacteria (270), chromista (707), fungi, including lichen-forming species (5844), plants (9107) and protozoa (1440). The Cuban trogon or tocororo is the national bird of Cuba and an endemic species. Hedychium coronarium, named mariposa in Cuba, is the national flower.

Cuba is home to six terrestrial ecoregions: Cuban moist forests, Cuban dry forests, Cuban pine forests, Cuban wetlands, Cuban cactus scrub, and Greater Antilles mangroves. It had a 2019 Forest Landscape Integrity Index mean score of 5.4/10, ranking it 102nd globally out of 172 countries.

According to a 2012 study, Cuba is the only country in the world to meet the conditions of sustainable development put forth by the WWF.

Demographics

According to the official census of 2010, Cuba's population was 11,241,161, comprising 5,628,996 men and 5,612,165 women. Its birth rate (9.88 births per thousand population in 2006) is one of the lowest in the Western Hemisphere. Although the country's population has grown by about four million people since 1961, the rate of growth slowed during that period, and the population began to decline in 2006, due to the country's low fertility rate (1.43 children per woman) coupled with emigration.

Migration

Immigration

Immigration and emigration have played a prominent part in Cuba's demographic profile. Between the 18th and early 20th century, large waves of Canarian, Catalan, Andalusian, Galician, and other Spanish people immigrated to Cuba. Between 1899 and 1930 alone, close to a million Spaniards entered the country, though many would eventually return to Spain. Other prominent immigrant groups included French, Portuguese, Italian, Russian, Dutch, Greek, British, and Irish, as well as small number of descendants of U.S. citizens who arrived in Cuba in the late 19th and early 20th centuries. As of 2015, the foreign-born population in Cuba was 13,336 inhabitants per the World Bank data.

Emigration

Post-revolution Cuba has been characterized by significant levels of emigration, which has led to a large and influential diaspora community. During the three decades after January 1959, more than one million Cubans of all social classes—constituting 10% of the total population—emigrated to the United States, a proportion that matches the extent of emigration to the U.S. from the Caribbean as a whole during that period. Prior to 13 January 2013, Cuban citizens could not travel abroad, leave or return to Cuba without first obtaining official permission along with applying for a government-issued passport and travel visa, which was often denied. Those who left the country typically did so by sea, in small boats and fragile rafts. 

On 9 September 1994, the U.S. and Cuban governments agreed that the U.S. would grant at least 20,000 visas annually in exchange for Cuba's pledge to prevent further unlawful departures on boats. As of 2013 the top emigration destinations were the United States, Spain, Italy, Puerto Rico, and Mexico. Following a tightening of U.S. sanctions and damage to the tourist industry by the COVID-19 pandemic, emigration has accelerated. In 2022, more than 2% of the population (almost 250,000 Cubans out of 11 million) migrated to the United States, and thousands more went to other countries, a number "larger than the 1980 Mariel boatlift and the 1994 Cuban rafter crisis combined", which were Cuba's previous largest migration events.

Fertility
As of 2022 Cuba's fertility rate is 1.582 births per woman.
Cuba's drop in fertility is among the largest in the Western Hemisphere and is attributed largely to unrestricted access to legal abortion: Cuba's abortion rate was 58.6 per 1000 pregnancies in 1996, compared to an average of 35 in the Caribbean, 27 in Latin America overall, and 48 in Europe. Similarly, the use of contraceptives is also widespread, estimated at 79% of the female population (in the upper third of countries in the Western Hemisphere).

Ethnoracial groups

Cuba's population is multiethnic, reflecting its complex colonial origins. Intermarriage between diverse groups is widespread, and consequently there is some discrepancy in reports of the country's racial composition: whereas the Institute for Cuban and Cuban-American Studies at the University of Miami determined that 62% of Cubans are black using the one drop rule, the 2002 Cuban census found that a similar proportion of the population, 65.05%, was white.

In fact, the Minority Rights Group International determined that "An objective assessment of the situation of Afro-Cubans remains problematic due to scant records and a paucity of systematic studies both pre- and post-revolution. Estimates of the percentage of people of African descent in the Cuban population vary enormously, ranging from 34% to 62%".

A 2014 study found that, based on ancestry informative markers (AIM), autosomal genetic ancestry in Cuba is 72% European, 20% African, and 8% Indigenous. Around 35% of maternal lineages derive from Cuban Indigenous People, compared to 39% from Africa and 26% from Europe, but male lineages were European (82%) and African (18%), indicating a historical bias towards mating between foreign men and native women rather than the inverse.

Asians make up about 1% of the population, and are largely of Chinese ancestry, followed by Japanese and Filipino. Many are descendants of farm laborers brought to the island by Spanish and American contractors during the 19th and early 20th century. The current recorded number of Cubans with Chinese ancestry is 114,240.

Afro-Cubans are descended primarily from the Yoruba people, Bantu people from the Congo basin, Kalabari tribe and Arará from the Dahomey as well as several thousand North African refugees, most notably the Sahrawi Arabs of Western Sahara.

Religion

In 2010, the Pew Forum estimated that religious affiliation in Cuba is 59.2% Christian, 23% unaffiliated, 17.4% folk religion (such as santería), and the remaining 0.4% consisting of other religions. In a 2015 survey sponsored by Univision, 44% of Cubans said they were not religious and 9% did not give an answer while only 34% said they were Christian.

Cuba is officially a secular state. Religious freedom increased through the 1980s, with the government amending the constitution in 1992 to drop the state's characterization as atheistic.

Roman Catholicism is the largest religion, with its origins in Spanish colonization. Despite less than half of the population identifying as Catholics in 2006, it nonetheless remains the dominant faith. Pope John Paul II and Pope Benedict XVI visited Cuba in 1998 and 2011, respectively, and Pope Francis visited Cuba in September 2015. Prior to each papal visit, the Cuban government pardoned prisoners as a humanitarian gesture.

The government's relaxation of restrictions on house churches in the 1990s led to an explosion of Pentecostalism, with some groups claiming as many as 100,000 members. However, Evangelical Protestant denominations, organized into the umbrella Cuban Council of Churches, remain much more vibrant and powerful.

The religious landscape of Cuba is also strongly defined by syncretisms of various kinds. Christianity is often practiced in tandem with Santería, a mixture of Catholicism and mostly African faiths, which include a number of cults. La Virgen de la Caridad del Cobre (the Virgin of Cobre) is the Catholic patroness of Cuba, and a symbol of Cuban culture. In Santería, she has been syncretized with the goddess Oshun. A breakdown of the followers of Afro-Cuban religions showed that most practitioners of Palo Mayombe were black and dark brown-skinned, most practitioners of Vodú were medium brown and light brown-skinned, and most practitioners of Santeria were light brown and white-skinned.

Cuba also hosts small communities of Jews (500 in 2012), Muslims, and members of the Baháʼí Faith.

Several well-known Cuban religious figures have operated outside the island, including the  humanitarian and author Jorge Armando Pérez.

Languages

The official language of Cuba is Spanish and the vast majority of Cubans speak it. Spanish as spoken in Cuba is known as Cuban Spanish and is a form of Caribbean Spanish. Lucumí, a dialect of the West African language Yoruba, is also used as a liturgical language by practitioners of Santería, and so only as a second language. Haitian Creole is the second-most spoken language in Cuba, and is spoken by Haitian immigrants and their descendants. Other languages spoken by immigrants include Galician and Corsican.

Education

The University of Havana was founded in 1728 and there are a number of other well-established colleges and universities. In 1957, just before Castro came to power, the literacy rate was as low as fourth in the region at almost 80% according to the United Nations, yet higher than in Spain. Castro created an entirely state-operated system and banned private institutions. School attendance is compulsory from ages six to the end of basic secondary education (normally at age 15), and all students, regardless of age or gender, wear school uniforms with the color denoting grade level. Primary education lasts for six years, secondary education is divided into basic and pre-university education. Cuba's literacy rate of 99.8 percent is the tenth-highest globally, largely due to the provision of free education at every level. Cuba's high school graduation rate is 94 percent.

Higher education is provided by universities, higher institutes, higher pedagogical institutes, and higher polytechnic institutes. The Cuban Ministry of Higher Education operates a distance education program that provides regular afternoon and evening courses in rural areas for agricultural workers. Education has a strong political and ideological emphasis, and students progressing to higher education are expected to have a commitment to the goals of Cuba. Cuba has provided state subsidized education to a limited number of foreign nationals at the Latin American School of Medicine.

According to the Webometrics Ranking of World Universities, the top-ranking universities in the country are Universidad de la Habana (1680th worldwide), Instituto Superior Politécnico José Antonio Echeverría (2893rd) and the University of Santiago de Cuba (3831st).

Health

After the revolution, Cuba established a free public health system.

Cuba's life expectancy at birth is 79.64 years (77.29 for males and 82.14 for females). This ranks Cuba 59th in the world and 4th in the Americas, behind Canada, Chile and the United States. Infant mortality declined from 32 infant deaths per 1,000 live births in 1957, to 10 in 1990–95, 6.1 in 2000–2005 and 5.13 in 2009. Historically, Cuba has ranked high in numbers of medical personnel and has made significant contributions to world health since the 19th century. Today, Cuba has universal health care and despite persistent shortages of medical supplies, there is no shortage of medical personnel. Primary care is available throughout the island and infant and maternal mortality rates compare favorably with those in developed nations. That an impoverished nation like Cuba has health outcomes rivaling the developed world is referred to by researchers as the Cuban Health Paradox. Cuba ranks 30th on the 2019 Bloomberg Healthiest Country Index, which is the only developing country to rank that high.

Disease and infant mortality increased in the 1960s immediately after the revolution, when half of Cuba's 6,000 doctors left the country. Recovery occurred by the 1980s, and the country's health care has been widely praised. The Communist government stated that universal health care was a priority of state planning and progress was made in rural areas. After the revolution, the government increased rural hospitals from one to 62. Like the rest of the Cuban economy, medical care suffered from severe material shortages following the end of Soviet subsidies in 1991, and a tightening of the U.S. embargo in 1992.

Challenges include low salaries for doctors, poor facilities, poor provision of equipment, and the frequent absence of essential drugs.

Cuba has the highest doctor-to-population ratio in the world and has sent thousands of doctors to more than 40 countries around the world. According to the World Health Organization, Cuba is "known the world over for its ability to train excellent doctors and nurses who can then go out to help other countries in need". , there are around 50,000 Cuban-trained health care workers aiding 66 nations. Cuban physicians have played a leading role in combating the Ebola virus epidemic in West Africa. Preventative medicine is very important within the Cuban medical system, which provides citizens with easy to obtain regular health checks.

Import and export of pharmaceutical drugs is done by the Quimefa Pharmaceutical Business Group (FARMACUBA) under the Ministry of Basic Industry (MINBAS). This group also provides technical information for the production of these drugs. Isolated from the West by the US embargo, Cuba developed the successful lung cancer vaccine, Cimavax, which is now available to US researchers for the first time, along with other novel Cuban cancer treatments. The vaccine has been available for free to the Cuban population since 2011. According to Roswell Park Comprehensive Cancer Center CEO Candace Johnson: "They've had to do more with less, so they've had to be even more innovative with how they approach things. For over 40 years, they have had a preeminent immunology community." During the thaw in Cuba–U.S. relations starting in December 2014 under the Obama administration, a growing number of U.S. lung cancer patients traveled to Cuba to receive vaccine treatment. The end of the thaw under the Trump Administration has resulted in a tightening of travel restrictions, making it harder for U.S. citizens to travel to Cuba for treatment.

In 2015, Cuba became the first country to eradicate mother-to-child transmission of HIV and syphilis, a milestone hailed by the World Health Organization as "one of the greatest public health achievements possible".

Largest cities

Media

The mass media in Cuba consist of several different types: television, radio, newspapers, and Internet. The Cuban media are tightly controlled by the Cuban government led by the Communist Party of Cuba (PCC) in the past five decades. The PCC strictly censors news, information and commentary, and restricts dissemination of foreign publications to tourist hotels. Journalists must operate within the confines of laws against anti-government propaganda and the insulting of officials, which carry penalties of up to three years in prison. Private ownership of broadcast media is prohibited, and the government owns all mainstream media outlets.

Internet in Cuba has some of the lowest penetration rates in the Western hemisphere, and all content is subject to review by the Department of Revolutionary Orientation. ETECSA operates 118 cybercafes in the country. The government of Cuba provides an online encyclopedia website called EcuRed that operates in a "wiki" format. Internet access is limited. The sale of computer equipment is strictly regulated. Internet access is controlled, and e-mail is closely monitored.

Since 2018, access to Internet by mobile data is available. In 2019, 7.1 million Cubans could access the Internet. The prices of connections, since WiFi zones, or mobile data, or from houses through "Nauta Hogar" service have been decreasing, especially since the economic reform of January 2021, when all the salaries increased by at least 5 times, and the prices of Internet remain in the same point. In 2021, it was reported that 7.7 million Cuban people have Internet access. There were 6.14 million mobile connections in Cuba in January 2021.

Culture
 

Cuban culture is influenced by its melting pot of cultures, primarily those of Spain, Africa and the indigenous Taínos of Cuba. After the 1959 revolution, the government started a national literacy campaign, offered free education to all and established rigorous sports, ballet, and music programs.

Cuisine

Cuban cuisine is a fusion of Spanish and Caribbean cuisines. Cuban recipes share spices and techniques with Spanish cooking, with some Caribbean influence in spice and flavor. Food rationing, which has been the norm in Cuba for the last four decades, restricts the common availability of these dishes. The traditional Cuban meal is not served in courses; all food items are served at the same time.

The typical meal could consist of plantains, black beans and rice, ropa vieja (shredded beef), Cuban bread, pork with onions, and tropical fruits. Black beans and rice, referred to as moros y cristianos (or moros for short), and plantains are staples of the Cuban diet. Many of the meat dishes are cooked slowly with light sauces. Garlic, cumin, oregano, and bay leaves are the dominant spices.

Literature

Cuban literature began to find its voice in the early 19th century. Dominant themes of independence and freedom were exemplified by José Martí, who led the Modernist movement in Cuban literature. Writers such as Nicolás Guillén and José Z. Tallet focused on literature as social protest. The poetry and novels of Dulce María Loynaz and José Lezama Lima have been influential. Romanticist Miguel Barnet, who wrote Everyone Dreamed of Cuba, reflects a more melancholy Cuba.

Alejo Carpentier was important in the magic realism movement. Writers such as Reinaldo Arenas, Guillermo Cabrera Infante, and more recently Daína Chaviano, Pedro Juan Gutiérrez, Zoé Valdés, Guillermo Rosales and Leonardo Padura have earned international recognition in the post-revolutionary era, though many of these writers have felt compelled to continue their work in exile due to ideological control of media by the Cuban authorities. However, several Cuban writers continue living and writing in Cuba, including Miguel Barnet, Nancy Morejón, Marta Rojas, Fina García Marruz, and Carilda Oliver Labra.

Music

Cuban music is very rich and is the most commonly known expression of Cuban culture. The central form of this music is son, which has been the basis of many other musical styles like "Danzón de nuevo ritmo", mambo, cha-cha-chá and salsa music. Rumba ("de cajón o de solar") music originated in the early Afro-Cuban culture, mixed with Spanish elements of style. The Tres was invented in Cuba from Spanish cordophone instruments models (the instrument is actually a fusion of elements from the Spanish guitar and lute). Other traditional Cuban instruments are of African origin, Taíno origin, or both, such as the maracas, güiro, marímbula and various wooden drums including the mayohuacán.

Popular Cuban music of all styles has been enjoyed and praised widely across the world. Cuban classical music, which includes music with strong African and European influences, and features symphonic works as well as music for soloists, has received international acclaim thanks to composers like Ernesto Lecuona. Havana was the heart of the rap scene in Cuba when it began in the 1990s.

During that time, reggaetón grew in popularity. In 2011, the Cuban state denounced reggaetón as "degenerate", directly reducing "low-profile" airplay of the genre (not banning it entirely), and banned the song "Chupi Chupi" by Osmani García, characterizing its description of sex as "the sort which a prostitute would carry out." In December 2012, the Cuban government officially banned sexually explicit reggaeton songs and music videos from radio and television.

Recognized Cuban artists include Los Van Van orchestra, known as "the music machinery of Cuba", pianists Chucho Valdés and Frank Fernández (the latter won the Golden title at the Tchaikovsky Conservatory), and Omara Portuondo, member of the Buena Vista Social Club. Many Cuban artists have won Grammy Awards. Between the youth, Buena Fe is a popular group.

Dance

Cuban culture encompasses a wide range of dance forms. Danzón was the official musical genre and dance of Cuba. Mambo music and dance developed originally in Cuba, with further significant developments by Cuban musicians in Mexico and the US. The cha-cha-cha is another dance of Cuban origin, while the Cuban bolero originated in Santiago de Cuba in the last quarter of the 19th century. Concert dance is supported by the government and includes internationally renowned companies such as the Ballet Nacional de Cuba.

Salsa dancing originated in Cuba and Cuban salsa is danced around the world.

Sports

Due to historical associations with the United States, many Cubans participate in sports that are popular in North America, rather than sports traditionally played in other Latin American nations. Baseball is the most popular. Other popular sports include volleyball, boxing, athletics, wrestling, basketball and water sports. Cuba is a dominant force in amateur boxing, consistently achieving high medal tallies in major international competitions. Cuban boxers are not permitted to turn professional by their government. Boxers Rances Barthelemy and Erislandy Lara defected to the U.S. and Mexico respectively. Cuba also provides a national team that competes in the Olympic Games. Jose R. Capablanca was a Cuban world chess champion from 1921 to 1927.

See also

Index of Cuba-related articles
Outline of Cuba
 The Cuba Libre Story
List of Caribbean islands

Notes

References

Bibliography

External links

Official site of the Government of Cuba 
Cuba from University of Colorado Boulder Libraries
Cuba. The World Factbook. Central Intelligence Agency.
Key Development Forecasts for Cuba from International Futures

 
1515 establishments in the Spanish West Indies
1898 disestablishments in the Spanish West Indies
1898 establishments in the United States
1902 disestablishments in the United States
1902 establishments in North America
Communist states
Countries in North America
Countries in the Caribbean
Eastern Bloc
Former colonies in North America
Former Spanish colonies
Greater Antilles
Island countries
Member states of the United Nations
New Spain
One-party states
Republics
Small Island Developing States
Spanish-speaking countries and territories
Spanish Caribbean
Spanish colonization of the Americas
Spanish West Indies
States and territories established in 1902